Hilary Kpatcha (born 5 May 1998 in Lomé) is a Togolese-born French athlete specialising in the long jump. She represented her country at the 2019 World Championships in Doha without reaching the final. Earlier that year she won a gold medal at the European U23 Championships in Gävle.

Her personal bests in the event are 6.81 metres outdoors (+1.6 m/s, Gävle 2019) and 6.47 metres indoors (Miramas 2019).

International competitions

References

1998 births
Living people
French female long jumpers
World Athletics Championships athletes for France
People from Lomé
French sportspeople of Togolese descent
French Athletics Championships winners